William Hook (or Hooke) may refer to:

 William Hooke (minister) (1600–1677), an English minister
 William Hooke (governor) (1612–1652), the governor of New Somersetshire in North America
 Bill Hook (1925–2010), an American chess player
 William Cather Hook (1857–1921), a United States federal judge
 William Hooke (screenwriter), writer of Shark Attack and its sequels

See also

Billhook, a farming implement sometimes used as a weapon